Fabergé is a brand name that was inspired by the House of Fabergé jewellery firm, which had been founded in 1842 in Russia. The name was used for various personal care products (including cosmetics) that were manufactured under the direction of Samuel Rubin (from the late 1930s to 1964), and then by George Barrie (from 1964 to 1984). The Fabergé company was sold by Barrie in 1984, and was subsequently acquired by Unilever in 1989.

In 2007, the Fabergé trademarks, licences and rights were sold by Unilever and transferred to a new company named Fabergé Limited, which announced its intention to make Fabergé a luxury goods brand.

History

Samuel Rubin
During the course of business ventures in communist Russia during the 1920s, American oil tycoon Armand Hammer acquired many objects made by the original House of Fabergé, including Fabergé eggs. In 1937, Hammer’s friend Samuel Rubin, owner of the Spanish Trading Corporation (which imported soap and olive oil), closed down his company because of the Spanish Civil War and established a new enterprise to manufacture perfumes and toiletries. Rubin registered his new firm in 1937 as Fabergé Inc., at Hammer's suggestion.

The Fabergé family did not learn about this until after World War II ended. Unable to afford protracted and expensive litigation, they settled out of court in 1951, for US$25,000 (equal to $ today) for the Fabergé name to be used in connection with perfume. Soon, Rubin added cosmetics and toiletries under the Fabergé banner, usually sold in upscale department stores. Fabergé had a high-prestige status, similar to its rivals Coty, Guerlain and Elizabeth Arden.

George Barrie

In 1964, Rubin sold Fabergé Inc. for $26 million to George Barrie and the Rayette cosmetics company. In 1964, Rayette changed its name to Rayette-Fabergé Inc., then in 1971, the company name was changed again to Fabergé Inc. From 1964 to 1984, under the direction of Barrie, Fabergé launched many successful cosmetics products and hired celebrities to endorse them. In addition, a media division made feature movies.

Barrie supervised the introduction of the popular Brut toiletry line for Fabergé, which was promoted by football players Joe Namath, Paul Gascoigne and Kevin Keegan, as well as boxer Henry Cooper and actress Kelly LeBrock, among others. Brut became the best-selling cologne in the world at that time.

In 1967, movie star Cary Grant was appointed as a "creative consultant" to Rayette-Fabergé.  He spent a year attending sales conventions and visited Fabergé plants around the world.  In May 1968, Grant was elected as a member of Fabergé's board of directors.  He received a salary of $15,000 per year, a rent-paid luxury apartment in New York City (where Fabergé's HQ was located), unlimited travel expenses and use of the company's private fleet of planes and helicopters.  By 1970, Grant divided his time between Los Angeles and New York. He never endorsed specific products or appeared in commercials.

In 1970, future James Bond actor Roger Moore became another celebrity board member. Also in 1970, Barrie established Fabergé's film-making division, Brut Productions, which produced the Academy Award-winning movie A Touch of Class in 1973, and other feature movies.

Barrie launched the 'Babe' fragrance in 1976 which, in its first year, became Fabergé's largest-selling women's fragrance worldwide. The granddaughter of writer Ernest Hemingway, model and actress Margaux Hemingway, received a $1 million contract to promote the 'Babe by Fabergé' perfume in a very popular advertising campaign.  Her famous Babe campaign was remembered again by millions after her mysterious death in 1996.  Babe received two awards from the Fragrance Foundation for its launch – 'Most Successful Introduction of a Women's Fragrance in Popular Distribution' and 'Best Advertising Campaign for Women's Fragrance'.

In 1977, Barrie launched the Farrah Fawcett hair product and fragrance lines, and he signed the actress and star of Charlie's Angels to a promotional contract with Fabergé.  A famous Fabergé TV ad featured Joe Namath being shaved by Farrah Fawcett.

By 1984, the company had expanded its personal care products to Aphrodisia, Aqua Net Hair Spray, Babe, Cavale, Brut, Ceramic Nail glaze, Flambeau, Great Skin, Grande Finale, Just Wonderful, Macho, Kiku, Partage, Tip Top Accessories, Tigress, Woodhue, Xandu, Zizanie de Fragonard, Caryl Richards, Farrah Fawcett, and Fabergé Organics.

Meshulam Riklis
In 1984, McGregor Corporation (controlled by Israeli financier Meshulam Riklis), the marketer of Botany 500 clothing, acquired Fabergé and discontinued many Fabergé-branded products.  The company launched Mcgregor by Fabergé cologne the same year.  New product lines were introduced, including men's, women's and children's apparel under the trademarks Billy the Kid, Scoreboard and Wonderknit.

In 1986, Mark Goldston, a specialist in evaluating areas of untapped sales and profit, was named president of Fabergé.  He was principally responsible for targeting and acquiring Elizabeth Arden from Eli Lilly and Company. In 1988, Fabergé bought Sea & Ski.

Unilever
In 1989, an American subsidiary of Unilever bought Fabergé Inc. (along with Elizabeth Arden) for US$1.55 billion. The chairman of Unilever stated that the acquisition would increase the size of Unilever's personal products business by more than 25 percent.

In 2001, Lever Fabergé was formed through the merger of Lever Brothers and Elida Fabergé, two long-established Unilever companies. Lever Fabergé today owns hundreds of cosmetics, household and other brands, including Dove, Impulse, Sure, Axe, Organics, Timotei, Signal, Comfort, Domestos, Surf, Sun, and Cif. Unilever removed the Fabergé name from all of its products and packaging. Brut is now marketed in Europe by Brut Parfums Prestige.

Fabergé Limited
On January 3, 2007, Pallinghurst Resources (now Gemfields), an investment advisory firm based in London, announced that it had acquired Unilever’s entire global portfolio of trademarks, licences and associated rights relating to the Fabergé brand name for an undisclosed sum. The trademarks, licences and associated rights were transferred to a newly constituted company, named Fabergé Limited, which was registered in the Cayman Islands.

In October 2007, the company announced that it intended to restore Fabergé to its rightful position as a leading purveyor of enduring and endearing personal possessions. Furthermore, it announced the reunification of the Fabergé brand and the Fabergé family, with Tatiana Fabergé and Sarah Fabergé (both great-granddaughters of Peter Carl Fabergé) becoming founding members of the Fabergé Heritage Council, a division of Fabergé Limited that was to offer counsel to the new company. The new owners aimed to make Fabergé a luxury goods brand and to sell individually branded Fabergé gemstones, with guaranteed provenance and ethical sourcing of the stones. Mark Dunhill became the CEO in 2007, and the company launched its 'Haute Couture' jewellery collection in 2009.

Promotion
The cologne Brut 33 by Fabergé had a product placement in the 1974 James Bond movie The Man with the Golden Gun. During a fight in the dancer's dressing room, Roger Moore sprays two of the villains in the face with an aerosol can of what is Brut-33 anti-perspirant, a nod to the Fabergé company with which Moore was associated.

Limited licences to endorse products with the Fabergé name were given to Barbie, Limoges, The Franklin Mint and others.

References

External links
 Fabergé Eggs Video at YouTube
 Lever Fabergé
 Samuel Rubin profile at undueinfluence.com
 Fabergé history from About.com
 Richard Barrie, Fabergé Inc.
 Rayette-Fabergé
 Faberge.com (current company)

 
Former Unilever brands
Chemical companies established in 1964
Manufacturing companies disestablished in 1984
Cosmetics brands